The IAAF Golden League was an annual series of outdoor track and field meetings organised by the International Association of Athletics Federations (IAAF). Athletes who won specific events at all of the series meetings were awarded a jackpot prize, sometimes given in gold bars, which inspired the series name. The competition began with seven meetings and it lasted for twelve years as the IAAF's top tier of one-day meetings. Within the IAAF's global circuit, athletes received additional points for their performances at the Golden League for the IAAF Grand Prix (1998–2002), IAAF World Outdoor Meetings (2003–2005), then IAAF World Athletics Tour (2006–2009). The Golden League was replaced in 2010 by the Diamond League, which marked an expansion to fourteen seasonal meetings covering all track and field events except the hammer throw.

The origins of the Golden League trace back to the Golden Four series that ran from 1993 to 1997, comprising four top level European meetings on the IAAF Grand Prix circuit (Berlin, Brussels, Oslo, and Zürich). The first Golden League was held as the new top tier of the 1998 IAAF Grand Prix and consisted of the former Golden Four meetings, plus Rome, Monaco, and the 1998 IAAF Grand Prix Final in Moscow. From the 1999 IAAF Golden League onwards, the Meeting Gaz de France in Paris was added and the Grand Prix Final dropped. That year all meetings were scheduled for Wednesday evenings in order to improve the sport's television coverage. When the IAAF Grand Prix was succeeded by the IAAF World Outdoor Meetings series in 2003, the Monaco meeting was removed from the Golden League series and made host of the IAAF World Athletics Final instead. The Golden League meetings remained unchanged from 2003 to 2009.

The series had three title sponsors in its history, starting with Ericsson in 1998, TDK in 2004 and 2005, then ÅF in 2008 and 2009.

Editions

Meetings

In 2004, the Bislett Games were moved from Oslo to the Fana Stadion in Bergen due to the redevelopment of the Bislett Stadium. The renovation was a requirement to its maintaining Golden League status.

Jackpot

Rules
The jackpot and its eligibility rules changed through the competition's history. Each year, a number of men's and women's events were made eligible for the Golden League jackpot if an athlete won their event at all Golden League meetings. This ranged from five to eight men's events and five to six women's events for each year. In the first two years, jackpot winners shared in a US$1 million prize. In 2000 and 2001, this was changed to 50 kg of gold bars and athletes only had to win at 5 out of 7 meetings to qualify for the jackpot. In 2003, the prize structure reverted to US$1 million for athletes winning at all the meets only, and a new stipulation was that athletes also had to compete at the IAAF World Athletics Final. 

From 2006 onwards, the jackpot events were set to five men's events and five women's events, ensuring gender equality. The award structure was also changed in 2006 so that athletes who won any five of the six events shared in a purse of US$250,000, while the remaining US$750,000 would be divided among athletes who won all six meetings. This was to a response to the fact that only four athletes shared in the jackpot in the three previous seasons. From 2007 onwards, the jackpot was again only shared amongst athletes who won at all six meetings.

Events

Winners

The 2006 series had a split prize pot, with US$250,000 shared between the athletes who won at five meetings, and US$750,000 being shared among athletes who won at all six meetings.

Events by year

References

External links

 2009 IAAF Golden League official website (archived)

 
Golden League
Defunct athletics competitions
Golden League
IAAF World Athletics Tour
Golden League
Golden League
Recurring sporting events established in 1998
Recurring sporting events disestablished in 2009